Corsican may refer to:

Someone or something from Corsica
Corsicans, inhabitants of Corsica
Corsican language, a Romance language spoken on Corsica and northern Sardinia
Corsican Republic, a former country in Europe
"The Corsicans", the original name of the Hearts of Oak militia in Colonial New York

See also
List of all pages beginning with "Corsican"
List of Corsicans
Corsicana, Texas
Corsica (disambiguation)
Corse (disambiguation)

Language and nationality disambiguation pages